Cabrières  (Languedocien: Cabrièiras) is a commune in the Hérault department in southern France. It is noted for its flourishing wine industry.

Viticulture
Cabrières wine is marketed under the AOC Coteaux du Languedoc.  This is the smallest of the Languedoc Roussillon appellations.

Grape varieties permitted are:
 White : Bourboulenc, Roussanne, Marsanne, Clairette, Terret
 Rosé : Grenache (10% maximum when blended) or Cinsaut (45% minimum for rosés; 40% maximum for reds)
 Red : Carignan, Grenache, Mourvèdre and Syrah.

The Grenache, Mourvèdre and Syrah varieties combined must add up to a minimum of 50%.

The majority of wine production takes place in the Cave Coopérative des Vignerons de l'Estabel, which has been bottling wine since 1948. Other production wineries are Le Domaine du Temple, le Château des Deux Rocs, le Clos Romain, le Mas de Valbrune and le Mas Cauvi. All told, Cabrières wine production is restricted to 20,000 hectolitres.

Geology
The GSSP for the Tournaisian is near the summit of La Serre hill, in the commune of Cabrières, in the Montagne Noire (southern France). The GSSP is in a section on the southern side of the hill, in an 80 cm deep trench, about 125 m south of the summit, 2.5 km southwest of the village of Cabrières and 2.5 km north of the hamlet of Fontès.

Population

See also
Communes of the Hérault department

References

Communes of Hérault